Janskerk or St. John's Church may refer to:
 Sint Janskerk, Gouda, South Holland
 Janskerk, Haarlem, North Holland

See also
 St. John's Church (disambiguation)